Sir Robert Douglas, 3rd Baronet may refer to:

 Robert Douglas (New Zealand politician) (1837–1884)
 Sir Robert Douglas, 3rd Baronet (died 1692), Scottish soldier